George Gould may refer to:

 George Gould (Baptist) (1818–1882), English minister
 George Gould (businessman) (1865–1941), New Zealand farmer, racehorse owner and racing administrator
 George D. Gould (1927–2022), American financier
 George Jay Gould (1864–1923), American financier, a son of Jay Gould
 George M. Gould (1848–1922), American doctor and lexicographer